Mount McDuffie is a  mountain summit located west of the crest of the Sierra Nevada mountain range, in Fresno County of central California, United States. McDuffie ranks as the 93rd highest summit in California, and the second-highest point on Black Divide. An approach to this remote peak is made possible via the John Muir Trail.

History

This mountain's name honors Duncan McDuffie (1877–1951), to commemorate his interest in the national parks and his work as a conservationist. He was also an accomplished mountaineer in the Sierra Nevada, having made first ascents of Mount Abbot, Bear Creek Spire, and Black Kaweah. Along with James S. Hutchinson and Joseph Nisbet LeConte, he pioneered a high alpine route in 1908 from Yosemite National Park to Kings Canyon, roughly along the route of what would become the John Muir Trail. He served as President of the Sierra Club from 1928 to 1931, and again from 1943 to 1946. The name was officially adopted in 1953 by the United States Board on Geographic Names.

The first ascent of the summit was made July 23, 1951, by Charles Bays Locker, Karl Hufbauer, and Alfred Elkin via the north ridge.

Climbing
Established climbing routes:

 North Ridge –  – First ascent July 23, 1951
 Southeast Ridge – class 2-3 – July 15, 1952, by Charles Bays Locker, Karl Hufbauer, Don Albright, Gary Hufbauer
 Northwest Slope and West Ridge – class 3 – August 1971, by Dave Gladstone
 West Chute – class 3 – August 2, 1974, by Bob Rockwell
 Southwest Ridge – class 2 – August 10, 1989, by Dave Helphrey, Ron Robson, Reiner Stenzel

Climate
Mount McDuffie is located in an alpine climate zone. Most weather fronts originate in the Pacific Ocean, and travel east toward the Sierra Nevada mountains. As fronts approach, they are forced upward by the peaks, causing them to drop their moisture in the form of rain or snowfall onto the range (orographic lift). Precipitation runoff from this mountain drains into tributaries of the Middle Fork Kings River.

See also

 List of the major 4000-meter summits of California

References

External links
 Weather forecast: Mount McDuffie
 Mount McDuffie photo: Flickr

Mountains of Fresno County, California
Mountains of Kings Canyon National Park
North American 4000 m summits
Mountains of Northern California
Sierra Nevada (United States)